Arthur Stanhope (1627 – 26 March 1694) was an English politician who sat in the House of Commons between 1660 and 1679.

Life
Stanhope was born at Shelford, Mansfield Woodhouse, Nottinghamshire, the son of Philip Stanhope, 1st Earl of Chesterfield and his wife Catherine Hastings, daughter of Francis Hastings, Lord Hastings and was baptised on 10 April 1627. He entered Gray's Inn in 1642. Three older brothers were killed on the Royalist side in the English Civil War but he tended to support the parliamentary party. He lived at Shelford Manor which was badly damaged in 1660 when the disintegrating Commonwealth army attacked Nottingham.

In 1660, with his uncle and friend Colonel John Hutchinson, Stanhope was elected Member of Parliament for Nottingham in the Convention Parliament. He was re-elected MP for Nottingham in 1661 for the Cavalier Parliament.

Stanhope died at the age of about 66 and was buried at Shelford.

Family
Stanhope married Anne Salusbury, daughter of Sir Henry Salusbury, 1st Baronet, the first of the Salusbury Baronets of Lleweni (1619) with whom he had four children.

Philip Stanhope born 1653, died 1670
Henry Stanhope born 1654, died 1665
Charles Stanhope born 1655, died 1712, ancestor of the fifth Earl and succeeding earls of Chesterfield
Catherine Stanhope born 1657, died 1705

Ancestry

References

Younger sons of earls
1627 births
1694 deaths
Politicians from Nottingham
Arthur
Members of Gray's Inn
English MPs 1660
English MPs 1661–1679
People from Rushcliffe (district)